Camp Five may refer to:
Camp Five, former name of Elinor, California
Camp Five Museum
Camp five (Guantanamo)